The Gong Show is an American amateur talent contest franchised by Sony Pictures Television to many countries. It was broadcast on NBC's daytime schedule from June 14, 1976, through July 21, 1978, and in first-run syndication from 1976 to 1980 and 1988 to 1989, and was revived in 2017 for broadcast on ABC. The show was created and originally produced by Chuck Barris, who also served as host for the NBC run and from 1977 to 1980 in syndication. Its most recent version was executive-produced by Will Arnett and hosted by Tommy Maitland, a fictional character performed by Mike Myers (uncredited in Season 1). The Gong Show is known for its absurdist humor and style, with the actual competition secondary to the often outlandish acts presented; a small cash prize has typically been awarded to each show's winner.

Format
Each show presented a competition of amateur performers of often dubious talent, with a panel of three celebrity judges. The original program's regular judges included Jamie Farr, Jaye P. Morgan, Arte Johnson, Patty Andrews, Phyllis Diller, Pat McCormick, Wayland Flowers, Anson Williams, Steve Garvey, Rex Reed and Rip Taylor. Throughout the program's run, several other celebrities occasionally appeared as judges including David Letterman, Steve Martin, Mort Sahl, Chuck Woolery, Allen Ludden and Sandy Duncan. If any judge considered an act to be particularly bad, they could force it to stop by striking a large gong, a trope adapted from the durable radio show Major Bowes Amateur Hour. Barris would then ask the judge(s) in question why they had gonged the act, usually receiving a facetious response.

Any act that survived without being gonged was given a score by each of the three judges on a scale of 0 to 10, for a maximum possible score of 30. On the NBC series, the contestant who achieved the highest combined score won the grand prize: a check for $516.32 (a "highly unusual amount", in Barris's words; reportedly the Screen Actors Guild's minimum pay for a day's work at the time) and a "Golden Gong" trophy. In the show's opening monologue, Barris would describe the amount as "five hundred and sixteen big ones, and thirty-two little ones". The syndicated series' top prize was originally $712.05 (the first episode was $996.83) and later increased to $716.32. In the event of a tie, three different tiebreakers were used at various times during the show's run. Originally the studio audience determined the winner by applause, but this was later changed to a decision by the producers, and later by the celebrity judges. On rare occasions, both winning acts would each receive a check and a trophy. No prize was awarded if all of the acts on a particular episode were gonged, which occurred at least twice. Runners-up received various prizes; Maureen Orth, on her February 24, 1977, appearance, reported receiving an iron valued at $33.95 for her second-place finish.

When Barris announced the final score, actor Jerry Maren (a little person and former Munchkin) ran onstage in top hat and tails, throwing confetti while balloons dropped from overhead.

The daily Gong Show also gave out a "Worst Act of the Week" award (later changed to the "Most Outrageous Act of the Week"), selected by the producers and each week's judges. The winner of this award was announced following the trophy presentation on the Friday show, and the performer received a dirty tube sock and a check for $516.32.

Legitimate talent
The two biggest Gong Show-related showbiz successes were Andrea McArdle and Cheryl Lynn. Twelve-year-old McArdle appeared on an early episode in 1976, shortly before she won the leading role in the hit Broadway musical Annie. Following her Gong Show appearance, Lynn was signed to a recording contract with Columbia Records and she recorded the Top 40 disco hit "Got To Be Real".

Among the other true talents that appeared on the show were country singer Boxcar Willie; actor Kevin Peter Hall who later appeared as the original Predator in the 1987 film and as Harry in Harry and the Hendersons; comics and actors Paul Reubens and John Paragon (best known as Pee Wee Herman and Jambi the Genie); Joey D'Auria ("Dr. Flameo", later WGN's second Bozo the Clown); impressionist/comic Michael Winslow; novelty rock band Green Jellÿ; and an unknown band called The Mystic Knights of the Oingo Boingo which evolved into Oingo Boingo, led by future film and television score composer Danny Elfman. In 1979, Crips founder and executed murderer Stanley Tookie Williams appeared on the show as a bodybuilder. Future Academy Award-nominated actress Mare Winningham sang the Beatles song "Here, There, and Everywhere" on the program in 1976. Future Super Bowl XXXV winning head coach Brian Billick also made an appearance, performing a routine known as the "spider monkey". Dancer Danny Lockin, who had played Barnaby in the film Hello Dolly!, was murdered hours after winning the show taped August 21, 1977. Television personality, actress and entrepreneur, Rhonda Shear appeared on the program in 1979. Journalist Maureen Orth, then writing for Newsweek, won second-place on a 1977 show, appearing as "The World's Oldest Cheerleader."

Personnel

Barris as emcee

An established game show producer (The Dating Game, The Newlywed Game), Barris was originally the show's co-producer but not its host. He was an emergency replacement host for eventual Real People host John Barbour, who had objected to the show's satirical concept and tried to steer it toward a traditional amateur-hour format.

Producer Chris Bearde, formerly of Rowan and Martin's Laugh-In and The Sonny & Cher Comedy Hour, clashed with Barris over the show's content, favoring scripted comedy over chaotic nonsense. (Bearde's "new talent" segments on Laugh-In had featured oddball performers, the most famous being Tiny Tim.) After a violent argument involving the throwing of punches, chairs and other objects, Bearde resigned from The Gong Show, leaving Barris fully in charge. Before long, Barris was working so loosely that some viewers assumed he was intoxicated from alcohol or other drugs. Barris later recounted, in an interview with the Archive of American Television, that he was never drunk, and that he would not allow the use of drugs in his production company.

Musical direction
Milton DeLugg, the show's musical director, was a popular musician and bandleader during the 1940s, and he got the Gong Show job by default. As musical director for the network, he was responsible for any NBC project that required special music (like the annual telecasts of the Macy's Thanksgiving Day Parade). Barris initially regarded DeLugg as "an anachronism", but he soon found that DeLugg was very much attuned to the crazy tone of the show. He appeared in recurring comedy skits with Barris.

Veteran composer Joey Carbone provided musical arrangements for the late 1980s revival with his own lineup of studio musicians, known as "The Gong Show Guys".

Announcers
Johnny Jacobs, who had worked for Barris for many years, was the main announcer from 1976 to 1980. When Jacobs was sidelined with an extended illness, Jack Clark substituted from October 3 through December 23, 1977. Charlie O'Donnell served as announcer for the late 1980s revival.

Hostesses
Hostesses included Siv Åberg (a Swedish-born model and actress  who appeared on Barris's syndicated New Treasure Hunt), actress Marlena Clark, porn star Carol Connors and Barris's teenage daughter, Della.

Broadcast history

NBC
NBC first aired the show at 12:30 p.m. (11:30 a.m. Central). This was the network's least important time slot, as programs running at that time had to share the half-hour with a five-minute NBC newscast anchored by Edwin Newman. As a result, the first six-plus months of The Gong Show featured approximately twenty minutes of program content in a twenty-five-minute episode.

Many NBC affiliates in some larger markets opted not to run network programming during the noon hour at all, preferring to broadcast local news and talk shows instead. Thus Gong made its debut mainly on medium-market and smaller stations or on large-market rival stations that had picked up the program from the NBC affiliate that had rejected it. For example, in Boston, then-NBC affiliate WBZ-TV did not run the series, allowing local UHF independent outlet WSBK-TV to air it.

Gong's time slot was given to a new soap opera, Lovers and Friends, on January 3, 1977, and the show was relocated to replace the cancelled Another World spinoff Somerset at 4:00 p.m. The time change allowed Gong to expand to a half-hour.

NBC broadcast a one-hour prime-time Gong Show special on April 26, 1977, featuring in-studio special guests Tony Randall, Alice Cooper and Harry James and His Orchestra. The winning act on this special was The Bait Brothers, and the panelists were Jaye P. Morgan, Jamie Farr and Arte Johnson.

"Popsicle Twins" incident
During The Gong Show'''s run, Barris became well known for his clashes with the network censors, intentionally bringing in risque acts as bait to allow some of the less racy acts to slip by. In 1977, one of these bait acts, called "Have You Got a Nickel?", made it onto the show. The act consisted of two teenage girls, both wearing shorts, sitting cross-legged on the stage floor and silently eating popsicles in a manner that suggested they were performing fellatio on the frozen treats. The nature of their act led to the two girls being referred to as the "Popsicle Twins".

While the girls were able to complete their act without being gonged, they were given low scores by two of the judges. Phyllis Diller gave them a zero, while Jamie Farr followed with a marginally better 2. Jaye P. Morgan awarded them a 10, quipping, "Do you know that's the way I started (in show business)?" and proceeded to eat one of the girls' popsicles.

Surprisingly, the girls' act was approved by the NBC censors, who apparently did not see anything wrong with it during the rehearsals. However, after the episode aired in the Eastern Time Zone, NBC cut the act from the later tape delay broadcast for western time zones. KNBC, alerted to the content, was able to preempt it. The act was not cut from all the tapes, and the "Popsicle Twins" incident has aired in reruns and retrospectives. Barris said in a 2001 interview with Salon.com that this particular act began making him reconsider his career.

Cancellation
Despite its popularity and respectable ratings for a non-soap-opera midday show, NBC cancelled The Gong Show, with its final episode broadcast on July 21, 1978. At the time, there was much speculation as to the network's true motivations for dumping the popular show. Barris has commented that he heard that NBC's official reason was because of both "lower than expected ratings" and a desire by the network to "re-tailor the morning shows to fit the standard morning demographics" (the move coincided with the arrival of new NBC president Fred Silverman, who was well known for such programming overhauls and was reported to have disliked The Gong Show). America Alive!, a magazine-style variety program hosted by Art Linkletter's son Jack, replaced Gong.

Following the cancellation, many critics and industry analysts – including Gene Shalit and Rona Barrett – reported having heard comments from within the NBC programming department from "sources preferring anonymity" that the true reason behind the cancellation was Barris's refusal to tone down the increasingly risqué nature of the show. According to the sources, after the "Popsicle Twins" incident and an episode in which Jaye P. Morgan spontaneously exposed her breasts on air during a Gene Gene the Dancing Machine segment, Barris had been given an ultimatum by the network's Standards and Practices department to deliver less racy shows for his audience, which included many younger viewers, or NBC would cancel the program.

Finale
NBC allowed Barris to continue the show for the rest of his contract, and Barris made no perceptible change in preparation for the finale. In the finale, staff member Larry Gotterer appeared as "Fenwick Gotterer" to host the show after Barris started the show doing a "Chuckie's Fables" sketch. The rest of the final episode tried to explain the life of the show and its cancellation. Barris managed to have the last word on the show's demise, appearing as a contestant. Playing in a country music band called "The Hollywood Cowboys" with the house band's rhythm section, Barris sang a slightly modified version of Johnny Paycheck's "Take This Job and Shove It", giving NBC the finger during the song to accentuate his point. NBC censored the gesture, with the word "OOPS!" superimposed over a still shot of the set. Barris was gonged by Jamie Farr, who quipped, "Because that little fella's been saying that I've been long of nose, I'm also long of gong, fella."   

The group "Lobster Repair" (who performed Harry Belafonte's song "Day-O") won the final $516.32 and trophy of the NBC era. Gotterer presented the award as Barris had been escorted off the set by NBC security.

Syndicated (1976–80)The Gong Show continued on TV in syndication for two years after its daytime counterpart's cancellation, often broadcast on weekends and at night. The entire syndicated run from September 1976 to September 1980 was distributed by Firestone Program Services. While the series eventually met its demise in syndication as it had on NBC, according to Barris, the problem did not lie with any outrageous acts, but instead the controversy and public outcry over another series he had produced.

In September 1979, Barris launched the game show Three's a Crowd, which was a spin-off of The Newlywed Game. Instead of recently married couples trying to match answers, the wives and secretaries of married men would compete to show who knew the men better. Religious activists and feminist groups protested against Three's a Crowd and its ratings eventually forced the show's cancellation during the middle of the season.

In Barris' autobiography The Game Show King, he wrote that "the public backlash from Three's a Crowd not only caused the program to be canceled, but it took three other TV shows of mine with it. I went to my house in Malibu and stayed there for a year." Gong was one of those shows to be canceled, and Barris never hosted another series. The trauma from the Three's a Crowd's backlash was so severe, in the last several weeks of the Gong Show, Barris reportedly had "a small nervous breakdown" on-air, because he was "bored to death" with broadcasting. His next two series, revivals of the 1960s game show Camouflage (the replacement for Three's a Crowd) and his 1973–77 series Treasure Hunt (toward which Barris had little or no input, according to host Geoff Edwards), both failed to find audiences and Barris went further into his self-imposed exile from television. Barris would not have another hit series until the 1985 syndication revival of The Newlywed Game.

Reruns of the NBC shows began in syndication in Fall 1979. The NBC and syndicated episodes were rerun on the USA Network and Game Show Network, although by the time GSN picked up the series, many episodes could not be broadcast because of musical performance clearance issues. No episodes from the first syndicated season were rerun.

Later incarnations
A syndicated weekday revival of The Gong Show, hosted by San Francisco disc jockey Don Bleu, ran during the 1988–89 season from September 12, 1988, to September 15, 1989, Each winner was paid $701.Extreme Gong, a later incarnation of The Gong Show on the Game Show Network had viewers vote on its acts by telephone. It was hosted by George Gray and ran from October 5, 1998, to August 26, 1999, with reruns continuing to air up until Fall of 2000. Winners received $317.69. This version was well known for two known incidents: one episode featuring "Cody the Talking Dog" for which he tried to say things like "I love you" and "ice cream" but did not succeed in talking, and another featuring a Village People parody as The Village Little People where they sang a cover of "YMCA". Orange County comedy punk band the Radioactive Chicken Heads (then called Joe & the Chicken Heads) made their national television debut on Extreme Gong, though they were gonged midway through their performance. Near the end of the show's run, an hour-long "Tournament of Talent" special was aired in August 1999, with twelve previous winning acts (chosen by viewers via a phone-in poll) competing for a payoff of $10,000.

Comedy Central debuted a new incarnation called The Gong Show with Dave Attell, which lasted for eight weeks in the summer of 2008. The show's format was similar to the original, but its scoring was based on a scale of 0 to 500, and winning acts received $600. The $600 was shown as paid in cash on the spot, rather than being paid by check as in earlier versions, but in reality (because of contestant eligibility regulations by Sony) was paid as a check from Sony Pictures. In place of a typical trophy, winners were awarded a belt in the style of boxing championship belts.

A live stage version of The Gong Show took place at B.B. King's Blues Club, in the Times Square district of New York City on August 12, 2010. It was produced by The Radio Chick, and is the Sony authorized stage production. This production went into development in 2011–12 and now runs regularly in New York City, with engagements in other U.S. cities.

2017 revival
On October 3, 2016, ABC and Sony Pictures announced a 10-episode summer 2017 revival of The Gong Show executive produced by Will Arnett.

The broadcast of the 2017 revival premiered on ABC on June 22, 2017, hosted by previously unknown "British comedian" Tommy Maitland. Maitland is, in fact, a character portrayed by Mike Myers, although neither ABC nor Myers confirmed this and ABC officially credited Maitland as host and executive producer. Maitland's catchphrase is "Who's a cheeky monkey?" He also periodically uses Barris' "back with more stuff" catchphrase to lead into commercials.

Celebrity guest judges for the 2017 revival included Arnett,  Zach Galifianakis, Alison Brie, Andy Samberg, Elizabeth Banks, Tracee Ellis Ross, Joel McHale, Megan Fox, Courteney Cox,  Dana Carvey, Will Forte, Jack Black, Jennifer Aniston, Ken Jeong, Fred Armisen, Maya Rudolph and Anthony Anderson. Among the more notable acts featured on the revival are the Radioactive Chicken Heads, making their second appearance on a Gong Show incarnation since Extreme Gong in 1998. The first season of this version also features a regular segment featuring a staff performer leading the audience in a sing-along of the novelty song "Shaving Cream", reminiscent of the recurring gag acts on the earlier version.

The winner of each show received a gong trophy and an oversized check in the amount of US$2,000.17, later increased by a penny the following year. The final episode of the first season featured a memorial to Barris, who died prior to the series' premiere in 2017.

On January 8, 2018, ABC announced that the revival would be picked up for a second season, officially confirmed Myers as the portrayer of Maitland and crediting Myers as an executive producer by name. The second (and final) season premiered on June 21, 2018. Celebrity guest judges for season 2 included Jimmy Kimmel, Jason Sudeikis, Brad Paisley, Dana Carvey, Alyson Hannigan, Ken Jeong, Kristen Schaal, and Rob Riggle. However, the series was not renewed for a third season and was quietly cancelled.

Film
In 1980, The Gong Show Movie was released by Universal Pictures to scathing reviews and was quickly withdrawn from theatrical release. Advertising proclaimed it as "The Gong Show That Got Gonged by the Censor". It is seen periodically on cable TV, but was not released on home video until March 29, 2016, when the film was released on Blu-ray by Shout! Factory.Confessions of a Dangerous Mind, a film directed by George Clooney and written by Charlie Kaufman, was based on the semi-fictional autobiography of the same name by Chuck Barris. Part of the film chronicles the making of The Gong Show, and features several clips from the original series.

Following the success of the print and screen versions of Confessions, GSN produced a documentary called The Chuck Barris Story: My Life on the Edge, which included rare footage from the Gary Owens pilot.

International versions

Spinoffs
At the height of the Gong Show's popularity, NBC gave Barris a prime-time variety hour, The Chuck Barris Rah Rah Show. This was played somewhat more seriously than the Gong Show, with Jaye P. Morgan singing straight pop songs as in her nightclub and recording days, and bygone headliners like Slim Gaillard reprising their old hits for a studio audience. Other spinoffs include The $1.98 Beauty Show hosted by Rip Taylor and The Gong Show Movie.

See also
 Minutes to Fame'', a similar Hong Kong talent show

References

External links
 ABC version
 The Gong Show (1976) on IMDb
 The Gong Show (1988) on IMDb
 Extreme Gong on IMDb
 The Gong Show with Dave Attell on IMDb
 The Gong Show (2017) on IMDb
 

1970s American comedy game shows
1976 American television series debuts
1980 American television series endings
1980s American comedy game shows
1988 American television series debuts
1989 American television series endings
2010s American comedy game shows
2017 American television series debuts
2018 American television series endings
American Broadcasting Company original programming
American television series revived after cancellation
English-language television shows
First-run syndicated television programs in the United States
NBC original programming
Talent shows
Television series by Barris Industries
Television series by Sony Pictures Television